Mara Croatto (born February 2, 1969) is a retired Venezuelan-born Puerto Rican actress.

Early years
Croatto is the daughter of Argentine actress Raquel Montero and Puerto Rican ( Italian Argentine born) folk singer, Tony Croatto. Shortly after birth in Caracas, Venezuela, her parents decided to move and resettle in Puerto Rico.

She was raised and educated in San Juan. When Croatto was 11 years old, she attended the D'Rose Modeling School, where she took modeling classes. She was an alumna of the Academia del Perpetuo Socorro in Miramar. Croatto always considers herself a Puerto Rican and publicly identifies herself as such.

Acting career
Croatto started her acting career as a narrator  in El Show de Shows ("The Show of Shows") which aired locally on Channel 11. She also worked as a dancer on such television shows Juventud 83 and Juventud 84 during her adolescence.

During her early adulthood, she won a small part on the television show La Pension de Doña Tere (Mrs. Tere Boardinghouse) starring Norma Candal. That year, she also worked in her first mini soap opera in which the members of Menudo participated. Her character was that of the sister of Ricky Martin who happened to be in love with Robby Rosa.

Her first important role in a soap opera was in Cisne Blanco (White Swan) with Deborah Carthy-Deu. Among the other soap operas in which she has participated are:

 María María 1989, Julia
 Pobre diabla 1990
 Marielena 1992, Graciela (Special performance)
 Guadalupe 1993-1994, Diana Zambrano
 Morelia 1995, Sarah (Special performance)
 Aguamarina 1997, Verona Calatrava
 La Mujer de Mi Vida 1998, Katiuska Cardona
 Me muero por ti 1999, Helena
 Gata Salvaje 2002-2003, Eduarda Arismendi - antagonist
 Amor descarado 2003, Chantal
 La ley del silencio 2005, Isabel
 Valeria 2008, Estrella Granados

Personal
Croatto was married to Juan Roselló, the brother of former Menudo member Roy Rosselló. She and Roselló have two sons together, Juan Alejandro and Michael Gabriel. On August 29, 2004, Croatto married Mexican actor José Ángel Llamas. They have one son together, Rafael.

In February 2011, Croatto and Llamas became born-again Christians, and they have quit acting to focus on their service to God.

See also 

List of Puerto Ricans

References

External links
 

1969 births
Living people
American people of Puerto Rican descent
Puerto Rican telenovela actresses
Puerto Rican people of Italian descent
Venezuelan emigrants to the United States
Venezuelan people of Argentine descent
Venezuelan people of Italian descent
20th-century Puerto Rican actresses
21st-century Puerto Rican actresses
American Christians
Puerto Rican people of Argentine descent
Puerto Rican Christians